Pererîta is a village in Briceni District, Moldova, located on the border with Romania.

Notable people 
 Grigore Vieru

References

Villages of Briceni District
Populated places on the Prut
Khotinsky Uyezd